La Kabylie française was a French language radical socialist weekly newspaper published from Tizi-Ouzou, Algeria. The newspaper was founded in 1885.

References

1885 establishments in Algeria
Defunct newspapers published in Algeria
French-language newspapers published in Algeria
Publications established in 1885
Socialist newspapers
Weekly newspapers
Publications with year of disestablishment missing